Novy is a rural locality (a khutor) in Kaysatskoye Rural Settlement, Pallasovsky District, Volgograd Oblast, Russia. The population was 66 as of 2010. There are 2 streets.

Geography 
Novy is located in steppe, on the Caspian Depression, 47 km south of Pallasovka (the district's administrative centre) by road. Kaysatskoye is the nearest rural locality.

References 

Rural localities in Pallasovsky District